The Holden Special Vehicles Maloo (or HSV Maloo), is a Performance Coupé Utility, or ute, built by Holden's performance vehicles department, Holden Special Vehicles (HSV), in Clayton, Victoria, produced from 1992 until 2017 (Final assembly of four vehicles completed in 2018), the Maloo holds a world record for worlds fastest truck/ute, the car, a LS2 powered VY series Maloo R8 achieved a top speed of  in 2006, Beating the record previously held by the Dodge Ram SRT10 by over 20 km/h. However Succeeding Maloos have surpassed this figure. The Maloo is to put it simply, a Ute version of HSV's ClubSport sedan. The Maloo was produced across three main variants: Maloo R8, Maloo R8 SV and Maloo GTS, however many others were produced throughout its lifetime, including the Gen F2's Maloo GTSR, and four examples of the 474kW LS9-powered Maloo GTSR W1 , after HSV staff discovered they had 4 excess Maloo GTSR bodies at their disposal, the Maloo GTSR W1 was never intended for production, however HSV let it slide and went ahead with the 4 examples, one in Light My Fire (Burnt Orange), the car most known Maloo W1, with the iconic Victorian 'W1UTE' HSV signature plates, one in XU-3 Yellah, the same colour as the original VR GTSR, one in Red, Holden's Hero colour and finally, Matte Grey. These are now valued at well over $1 Million (AUD).

References 

HSV vehicles
Coupé utilities